David Ricardo Loiola da Silva (born 21 December 2002), known as David Ricardo, is a Brazilian footballer who plays as a central defender for Ceará.

Club career
Born in Teresina, Piauí, David Ricardo began his career with hometown side Fluminense-PI, making his first team debut during the 2021 Campeonato Piauiense. In March 2022, he moved to Ceará on loan, being initially assigned to the under-20 squad.

David Ricard made his first team debut for Vozão on 11 May 2022, coming on as a second-half substitute for Gabriel Lacerda in a 2–0 home win over Tombense, for the year's Copa do Brasil. He made his Série A debut on 5 October, replacing Lucas Ribeiro in a 1–1 home draw against Goiás.

Career statistics

Honours
Fluminense-PI
Campeonato Piauiense: 2022

References

2002 births
Living people
People from Teresina
Brazilian footballers
Association football defenders
Campeonato Brasileiro Série A players
Fluminense Esporte Clube players
Ceará Sporting Club players